Trunk Highway 243 and  State Trunk Highway 243 (MN 243, WIS 243) are two short state highways in the U.S. states of Minnesota and Wisconsin. They connect MN 95 in Franconia Township, Minnesota with WIS 35 in Osceola, Wisconsin. The two highways meet at the state line on a bridge across St. Croix River. The two highways were designated in 1949. The bridge across the St. Croix River dates to 1953.

Route description
Highway 243 serves as a short route between Franconia Township and the village of Osceola. The highway starts at MN 95 on Osceola Road and runs southeasterly for a short distance before it turns northeasterly and parallel to the St. Croix River. Then it turns back to the southeast near some ponds along the riverbank to the bridge across the river. The highway crosses the state line into Wisconsin continuing to the southeast. Before the highway ends, it turns to the east to intersect WIS 35 in Osceola.

History
Trunk Highway 243 was authorized in 1949 in Minnesota, at the same time State Trunk Highway 243 was designated in Wisconsin. Dr. L.O. Simenstad was responsible for both highways being designated as part of their state highway systems. In 1952, the state of Minnesota reconstructed part of the roadway after a section of it washed out. The current bridge was built in 1953 and rebuilt in 1980 by the Wisconsin Department of Transportation (WisDOT). The bridge went through a month-long structural rehabilitation between late April and late May 2010. This project was being undertaken by Minnesota Department of Transportation (MnDOT) because the bridge is of similar design to the Interstate 35W Bridge over the Mississippi River that collapsed on August 1, 2007. At the same time as the closure, MnDOT repaved their stretch of Highway 243. WisDOT also repaved their segment of the roadway, and they removed some rock from a bluff near the highway overlooking the river. The project was completed on May 28, 2010, when the bridge reopened to cars and passenger trucks.

Major intersections

See also

Footnotes

References

External links

 Highway 243 Bridge, Osceola, WI
 Highway 243 at the Unofficial Minnesota Highways Page
 Highway 243 at Wisconsin Highways

243
243
Transportation in Chisago County, Minnesota
Transportation in Polk County, Wisconsin